General Anaya may refer to:

Pedro María de Anaya (1794–1854), military officer and two-time interim president of Mexico
General Anaya (former administrative division) ( 1928–1941), a former delegación of the Mexican Federal District.
General Anaya metro station (Mexico City)
General Anaya metro station (Monterrey)